The Potop is a left tributary of the river Sabar in Romania. It discharges into the Sabar east of Găești.

References

Rivers of Romania
Rivers of Dâmbovița County